The 1966 Australian Professional Championship was a professional non-ranking snooker tournament, which took place from 8 to 16 August 1966. There were three participants: defending champion Norman Squire, Eddie Charlton, and Warren Simpson.

Charlton won the tournament with a 7–4 victory over Simpson in the final, 7–4, after both Charlton and Simpson had defeated Squire in the round matches.

The tournament was sponsored by The Harbord Diggers Memorial Club, and held at that venue. Horace Lindrum was master of ceremonies for the event, and provided the trophy, known as "The Horace Lindrum Permanent Trophy," which was presented to Charlton by A. J. Chown, president of the Amateur Billiard Association of New South Wales, the competition organisers.

References

Australian Professional Championship
1966 in snooker
1966 in Australian sport
Sports competitions in Sydney